Nicola Malaccari (born 16 February 1992) is an Italian professional footballer who plays as a midfielder.

Club career
Born in Iesi, Malaccari started his career with Serie D club Tolentino. He made his senior debut on 2008–09 season. The next year, he was loaned to Serie C club Rimini, and he made his professional debut on 30 August 2009 against Reggiana.

He left Tolentino in 2011, and joined to Atalanta youth sector. After a spell in Avellino, he signed for Gubbio in June 2013.

After a long journey with Serie C clubs, in 2017 he returned to Gubio. Years after, he was named captain of the team.

References

External links
 
 

1992 births
Living people
Footballers from Marche
People from Iesi
Italian footballers
Association football midfielders
Serie C players
Serie D players
Rimini F.C. 1912 players
Atalanta B.C. players
U.S. Avellino 1912 players
A.S. Gubbio 1910 players
U.S. Savoia 1908 players
Paganese Calcio 1926 players
Lupa Roma F.C. players
S.S. Maceratese 1922 players
Sportspeople from the Province of Ancona